Piss is a profanity, swear word. Piss(es) or pissing may refer to:

 Urine, a liquid by-product of the body that is secreted by the kidneys and excreted through the urethra
 Urination, the ejection of urine to the outside of the body
 Piss (album), a 1993 album by Slank
 "Piss", a song by Pantera from the album Vulgar Display of Power
 "Piss", a song by Ministry from the album Animositisomina
 "Piss", a song by Neil Cicierega from the album Mouth Silence
 Piss (Černý), a 2004 sculpture by David Černý
 Pin Index Safety System (PISS), a type of safety system

See also 
 Pis (disambiguation)
 Pissed (disambiguation)
 Pisser (disambiguation)
 Pissing contest
 Pissy (disambiguation)
 Profanity
 Seven dirty words
 Taking the piss